Nicholas Edward Gonzalez is an American actor. He is best known for portraying the roles of Alex Santiago on the Showtime television series Resurrection Blvd and Dr. Neil Melendez on the ABC television series The Good Doctor.

Early life
Gonzalez was born in San Antonio, Texas. He is of Mexican descent. He is the son of a dermatologist surgeon, Dr. John Gonzalez, and his mother is Sylvia Mosier. He has an older brother named John Joseph Gonzalez and a younger sister named Madeline Mosier. Gonzalez is conversant in Spanish, having lived in a bilingual household. He attended Central Catholic High School in San Antonio, where he was an accomplished cross-country and track runner, winning the Texas State Championship in the mile and two-mile. After graduating in 1994 and turning down a presidential appointment to West Point, Gonzalez pursued an English degree at Stanford University in California. He spent two terms at Oxford University in England. The following summer, he returned to Europe on a research grant where he studied at Oxford and Trinity College, Dublin to complete his thesis on James Joyce's Ulysses. While at Stanford he had chanced on acting after taking an improvisational theatre elective and began taking part in student theater. He was approached to do a one-man theater piece called Gas by María Irene Fornés. Alma Martinez, an actress and Stanford professor, encouraged him to become a professional actor.

Upon graduating from Stanford in 1998 Gonzalez decided to pursue acting and, with Martinez's help, connected with the theatrical movement in San Francisco. He was once encouraged to use his middle name Edward to conceal his ethnicity and go by "Nicholas Edward" but declined to do so.

Career
In 1998, Gonzalez moved to Los Angeles, where he landed small parts in television series such as ABC's Dharma and Greg and NBC's One World.

Gonzalez then appeared as Fidel Castro's son in the Lifetime television movie My Little Assassin, starring Joe Mantegna and Gabrielle Anwar. His role as Andy, the gay yuppie on MTV's Undressed in which he appeared for six episodes, gained his first widespread attention.

Gonzalez wrapped production of two films in 2000. The first, Scenes of the Crime, premiered at the 2001 Cannes Film Festival, and starred Jeff Bridges, Jon Abrahams, and Noah Wyle. It was directed by Dominique Forma. The second film was an independent project titled Spun, starring Mena Suvari, Mickey Rourke, Brittany Murphy, and John Leguizamo. It played at the 2003 Sundance Film Festival. Gonzalez's also landed the lead in Showtime's original series Resurrection Blvd., which premiered June 26, 2000. Gonzalez played Alex Santiago, a pre-med student who dropped out of school to become a professional boxer. The movie was successful and immediately expanded to become a regular weekly series on the network.

While continuing his work on Resurrection Blvd., Gonzalez appeared in episodes of Walker, Texas Ranger and That '70s Show. He also appeared in the film The Princess and the Barrio Boy (released as She's in Love in Europe) with his Resurrection Blvd. co-star, Marisol Nichols.

Gonzalez continued his career in films with two more titles. The first, Sea of Dreams, was filmed in Veracruz, Mexico, in May, 2003. Nick then went to Fiji for the summer, where he completed production of Anacondas: The Hunt for the Blood Orchid, which opened in theaters August 27, 2004. Gonzalez also appeared in Melrose Place (2009). In 2011, he played Mateo on the ABC show Off The Map.

Gonzalez costarred in the Lifetime series Witches of East End. Gonzalez also appeared in recurring roles as Detective Marco Furey in Freeform's series Pretty Little Liars, antagonist Dominick Flores on How to Get Away with Murder and the boyfriend of Lisa Vidal's character on Being Mary Jane. He also guest-starred on Narcos as an undercover DEA special agent based in Colombia investigating the Cali Cartel, a role which required him to speak Spanish.

Gonzalez also provided the physical Performance (motion capture) of Nick Mendoza in the video game Battlefield: Hardline.

In 2017 Gonzalez was cast as a series regular in the role of surgeon Dr. Neil Melendez in the medical drama The Good Doctor, his most high-profile role to date. His portrayal of the character was partly based on his father and older brother, both of whom are doctors.

Awards 
In 2018, Gonzalez was awarded an Impact Award by the National Hispanic Media Coalition for his “Outstanding Performance in a Television Series”.

Personal life
Gonzalez finished 2nd at the World Poker Tour Celebrity Invitational in 2009.

Gonzalez married Kelsey Crane on April 16, 2016. The couple have one daughter named Ever Lee Wilde Gonzalez (born 2017),
and a son named Leo Camino Gonzalez (born 2021).

Filmography

Film

Television

Video games

References

External links

 

Central Catholic Marianist High School alumni
Alumni of Trinity College Dublin
American male film actors
American male television actors
Hispanic and Latino American male actors
Living people
Male actors from San Antonio
Stanford University alumni
American male actors of Mexican descent
Year of birth missing (living people)